Kenneth David Farragut, Jr. (December 23, 1928 – February 16, 2014) was an American football center.  He played professionally in the National Football League (NFL) for the Philadelphia Eagles.

High school years
Born in Ponchatoula, Louisiana, Farragut moved with his family to Moss Point, Mississippi, where he became a star center and linebacker for his high school team and their coach, Tom Swayze. The team went undefeated in 1945, with Farragut as captain. As a senior in 1946, he earned all-state honors. When Swayze took an assistant coaching job at the University of Mississippi in 1947, Farragut followed him, becoming one of coach Johnny Vaught's first recruits.

College career
At U of M, Farragut was the team captain in 1950.  Following his senior season in 1951, he was invited to play in the College All-Star Game in Chicago.

Professional career
Farragut was drafted in the sixth round (68th overall) of the 1951 NFL Draft by the Philadelphia Eagles, where he played center from 1951 to 1954.  He was named to the Pro Bowl in 1953.

Legacy
Farragut was selected to Ole Miss Hall of Fame in 1988 and the Pennsylvania Hall of Fame 1992.  He was the recipient of the NFL Alumni Career Achievement Award 1992.

Personal life and death
Retiring from football in 1954, Farragut remained in Philadelphia and eventually began a successful roofing company. His son David took over as CEO in 1997. Farragut died from complications of diabetes in February 2014. He was 85. He was survived by his wife Jane and their three children.

References

1928 births
2014 deaths
American football centers
Ole Miss Rebels football players
Philadelphia Eagles players
Eastern Conference Pro Bowl players
People from Moss Point, Mississippi
People from Ponchatoula, Louisiana
Players of American football from Mississippi